Regina Raull  (born Regina Margarita Raull Martin, 12 February 1928 – 14 November 2019) was a Spanish painter with residence in Mexico City.

A native of Bilbao, Raull emigrated from Spain with her family in 1939, arriving in Mexico in 1941 by way of the Dominican Republic . Her artistic studies took place at the Academy of San Carlos. Clearly an internationally renowned artist, her work is now part of Emperor Hirohito's, Jawaharlal Nerhu's and President Charles De Gaulle's collections among other private ones.    
She exhibited her work widely in Mexico and abroad, and produced numerous murals as well, including a series of "luminous" works in the center of Mexico City during the Christmas season in 1971.

References

1931 births
2019 deaths
Spanish women painters
20th-century Spanish painters
20th-century Spanish women artists
21st-century Spanish painters
21st-century Spanish women artists
People from Bilbao
Spanish emigrants to Mexico